7G or 7-G can refer to:

7G-Tronic, a Mercedes-Benz seven-speed automatic transmission
7G Rainbow Colony, a 2004 Tamil feature film
7G (album), a 2020 album by A. G. Cook
IATA code for StarFlyer
F-7G, a model of Chengdu J-7
Sector 7G, Homer Simpson's sector at work; see Springfield (The Simpsons)
Rearwin Ken-Royce 7G, an engine model by LeBlond Aircraft Engine Corporation
Operator 7G, the title by which EVE refers to Shogo Yahagi and Eiji Takanaka in the Megazone 23 anime OAV series.
7G, the production code for the 1987 Doctor Who serial Dragonfire

See also
G7 (disambiguation)